Stenoptilia gratiolae is a species of moth of the family Pterophoridae. It is found in many countries throughout Eurasia, including Jordan, western Russia, Ukraine, Bulgaria, Sweden, and Norway.

The wingspan is 19–22 mm.

The larvae feed on Gratiola officinalis.

References

gratiolae
Moths described in 1990
Plume moths of Asia
Plume moths of Europe